Oreta trispinuligera is a moth in the family Drepanidae. It was described by X.Y. Chen in 1985. It is found in China (Henan, Shaanxi, Gansu, Hubei, Fujian, Guangxi, Sichuan, Chongqing, Yunnan).

Adults are similar to Oreta trispina, but differ in the shape of the valve processes and terminal process of the aedeagus. This new species is characterized chiefly by three stouted spines of the valve processes, in the male genitalia, and the apex of the upper one bent towards the middle and the lower one smaller.

References

Moths described in 1985
Drepaninae